Dragon Ball Xenoverse is an action role-playing fighting game based on the Dragon Ball franchise developed by Dimps and published by Bandai Namco Games. It was released in February 2015 for PlayStation 3, PlayStation 4, Xbox 360, Xbox One, and Microsoft Windows.

A sequel, Dragon Ball Xenoverse 2 was released in 2016.

Gameplay 
The game is set almost entirely within a number of 3D areas, which are mostly modeled after notable locations in the Dragon Ball universe, accessed from the main hub – the Toki-Toki City. Fighters can traverse the levels free-roaming in large spaces and can fight on ground, in the air and underwater. The game features spoken dialogue from a majority of main characters while in battle, and characters show facial expressions when they strike an opponent or take damage. Although limited, the players have some freedom to explore the planet Earth as it exists in the Dragon Ball universe along with a handful of other locations, including the aforementioned Toki-Toki City.

Xenoverse is the third Dragon Ball game to feature character creation, the first being Dragon Ball Online and the second being Dragon Ball Z: Ultimate Tenkaichi. Player-created character has the option of becoming an apprentice of the original Dragon Ball characters in order to learn their special moves and access specific costume items. With character customization, players are able to customize their character's race, gender, facial hair, body features, clothing and character's voice effects. There are five available playable races: Saiyans, Namekians, Earthlings, Majins and Frieza's race; all of which have race specific advantages and bonuses as well as shortcomings.

The online multiplayer is accessed from the Toki-Toki City, which serves as a hub where players can form groups and take on cooperative, time-traveling missions.

Plot 
Xenoverse features an entirely original story starring the player's custom character. The story itself borrows elements from the Dragon Ball Online MMO, which sees returning villains Towa and Mira manipulating the history of the Dragon Ball universe. Time Patrol Trunks asks Shenron to send him a hero who would help him restore the timeline.

Development 
Dragon Ball Xenoverse is the first game developed by Dimps to feature full 3D battles, similar to Spike's Budokai Tenkaichi and Raging Blast series. It was first announced as the Dragon Ball New Project, until the actual title was revealed on June 10, 2014 during E3 2014.

The 2014 V-Jump #7 issue, in which the game was announced, draws attention to a mysterious figure watching the first battle between Goku and Vegeta from the shadows. With red hair, a scouter, and the Capsule Corporation logo on his sleeve, this character's identity was not clear. However, it was later revealed that this character is in fact a newly created character, confirming the game's character creation feature.

Promotion 
Pre-order releases from participating retailers of the game come with the exclusive Shenron Black Metalcase, Super Saiyan 4 Vegeta as a playable character and two exclusive versions of Frieza Soldier's Battle Suits for the player character. A collector's edition, called the Trunks Travel Edition, which includes a figurine of the character Trunks, has also been announced. Jaco the Galactic Patrolman, a character from the manga Jaco the Galactic Patrolman, a prequel to Dragon Ball, appears as a Japanese pre-order bonus, along with a Master Roshi costume set to customize the player's character with, a Trunks card for Dragon Ball Heroes, and a code that unlocks Trunks in Dragon Ball Z: Dokkan Battle.

Release 
Dragon Ball Xenoverse was originally released on February 5, 2015, in Japan and was slated for release on February 13 elsewhere, before being delayed. Following a two-week delay, it was released on February 24 in North America and February 27 in remaining territories.

Reception

Critical response

Dragon Ball Xenoverse received "mixed or average reviews". On review aggregating website Metacritic, which assigns a normalized rating in the 0–100 range, the PlayStation 4 version holds the score of 69/100 based on 50 reviews, while the Xbox One version holds 67/100 based on 18 reviews.

Popular Japanese video game magazine Famitsu gave the game an overall score of 30/40 saying that it "isn't without its faults and flaws" noting the repetitiveness of in-game missions and lag in team battles as its main drawbacks, concluding that the game is "aimed at Dragon Ball fans" and it might "appeal to fighting game fans and gamers that love fast action games". IGN gave the game a score of 6.7 out of 10, praising its "true-to-form graphics", unique story and customizable characters while criticizing its "shallow combat" and "unfair missions", noting that the game might appeal to "someone who enjoys anime, fighting, and role-playing games". Hardcore Gamer gave the game a 3.5 out of 5, praising the "create-a-character functionality", game mechanics and multiplayer mode, while criticizing the in-game camera movement and distancing from the established Dragon Ball continuity. GameTrailers gave it a slightly lower score of 6.0, noting the same flaws mentioned by both Famitsu and IGN, such as the "shallow combat" and repetitiveness as well as its potential appeal to mainly the franchise's established fan base rather than general audience while also noting that "those without such a strong attachment to the franchise may not be able to stomach the compromise."

GameSpot also gave the game a score of 6 out of 10, praising its detailed character customization system and a "new, interesting take on a tired story" while also criticizing its loose controls, repetitiveness and unbalanced gameplay. Destructoid gave it a score of 4.5 out of 10 or "below average", stating that it "has some high points, however they soon give way to glaring faults". While giving praise for the game's fighting mechanics and aesthetics as well as its similarity to source material, the general game design from balancing issues to repetitiveness is heavily criticized; saying that "Dragon Ball Xenoverse has some of the worst design decisions ever embedded into a video game", going on to conclude that "it certainly has its moments and the core fighting mechanics are great, however the game falls flat in too many other areas to be standout title." The review also specifically noted the lingering online service related technical difficulties and poor performance on certain platforms.

Toonami, during their aired video game review segments, gave the game a more favorable critique, giving it a score of 8 out of 10, stating that compared to the last few Dragon Ball games, Xenoverse "finally got it right" and that it's "a must" for Toriyama fans.

Sales 
As of March 17, 2015, 1.5 million copies have been shipped worldwide. The game was the second best-selling for PlayStation 4 on PlayStation Store for the month of February 2015, behind Dying Light. In April 2015, Bandai Namco Entertainment announced that more than 2.5 million copies had been sold. In February 2016, Bandai Namco Entertainment announced that a total of 3.13 million copies had been shipped worldwide. As of July 2018, Dragon Ball Xenoverse and Xenoverse 2 have collectively shipped over 10million units worldwide.

Sequel

On May 17, 2016, Bandai Namco announced a sequel titled Dragon Ball Xenoverse 2 for PlayStation 4, Xbox One, and Microsoft Windows. It was released for said consoles and Steam in October 2016, and for the Nintendo Switch on September 22, 2017.

References

External links
 

2015 video games
PlayStation 3 games
PlayStation 4 games
Xbox 360 games
Xbox One games
Windows games
Video games developed in Japan
Bandai Namco games
Dimps games
Xenoverse
Shueisha franchises
Fighting games
Video games featuring protagonists of selectable gender
Video games with cel-shaded animation
Multiplayer and single-player video games
Video games about time travel
Toei Animation video game projects
Video games using Havok
Video games with downloadable content
Video games with customizable avatars